Owl Creek may refer to:

 Owl Creek (Colorado)
 Owl Creek (North Fork Charrette Creek), a stream in Missouri
 Owl Creek (North River), a stream in Missouri
 Owl Creek (Sni-A-Bar Creek), a stream in Missouri
 Owl Creek (Sugar Creek), a stream in Missouri
 Owl Creek, North Carolina, an unincorporated community
 Owl Creek (Wisconsin), a stream in Wisconsin
 Owl Creek Mountains, Wyoming
 Owl Creek, Wyoming, a census-designated place
 Owl Creek, a firing range at Fort Hood, Texas

See also
 "An Occurrence at Owl Creek Bridge", a short story by Ambrose Bierce (also adapted into a film of the same name)